Anriquelis Barrios (born 20 August 1993) is a Venezuelan judoka. She is a gold medalist in the women's 63 kg event at the Central American and Caribbean Games. She is also a silver medalist in her event at the Pan American Games and the Pan American Judo Championships.

Career
At the 2019 Pan American Games held in Lima, Peru, she won the silver medal in the women's 63 kg event. In that same year, she also competed in the women's 63 kg event at the 2019 World Judo Championships held in Tokyo, Japan.

In 2020, she won the silver medal in her event at the Judo Grand Slam Hungary held in Budapest, Hungary. A month later, she won the silver medal in the women's 63 kg event at the 2020 Pan American Judo Championships held in Guadalajara, Mexico.

In January 2021, she competed in the women's 63 kg event at the Judo World Masters held in Doha, Qatar. A few months later, she won the silver medal in her event at the 2021 Judo Grand Slam Antalya held in Antalya, Turkey. In June 2021, she lost her bronze medal match in the women's 63 kg event at the 2021 World Judo Championships held in Budapest, Hungary. In July 2021, she lost her bronze medal match in the women's 63 kg event at the 2020 Summer Olympics held in Tokyo, Japan.

Achievements

References

External links
 

Living people
1993 births
Place of birth missing (living people)
Venezuelan female judoka
Pan American Games medalists in judo
Pan American Games silver medalists for Venezuela
Judoka at the 2015 Pan American Games
Judoka at the 2019 Pan American Games
Medalists at the 2019 Pan American Games
Competitors at the 2010 South American Games
South American Games bronze medalists for Venezuela
South American Games medalists in judo
Competitors at the 2014 Central American and Caribbean Games
Competitors at the 2018 Central American and Caribbean Games
Central American and Caribbean Games gold medalists for Venezuela
Central American and Caribbean Games silver medalists for Venezuela
Central American and Caribbean Games bronze medalists for Venezuela
Central American and Caribbean Games medalists in judo
Judoka at the 2020 Summer Olympics
Olympic judoka of Venezuela
20th-century Venezuelan women
21st-century Venezuelan women